On 10 June 1944, four days after D-Day, the village of Oradour-sur-Glane in Haute-Vienne in Nazi-occupied France was destroyed when 643 civilians, including non-combatant men, women, and children, were massacred by a German Waffen-SS company as collective punishment for resistance activity in the area.

The Germans essentially murdered all people they found in the village at the time, as well as people brought in from surroundings. The death toll includes people who were merely passing by in the village at the time of the SS company's arrival. Men were brought into barns and sheds where they were shot in the legs and doused with gasoline before the barns were set on fire. Women and children were herded into a church that was set on fire; those who tried to escape through the windows were machine gunned. Extensive looting took place.

All in all, 643 individuals are recorded to have been murdered. The death toll includes 17 Spanish citizens, 8 Italians, and 3 Poles.

6 people escaped the massacre. The last living survivor, Robert Hébras, known for his activism for reconciliation between France, Germany, and Austria, died on 11 February 2023, aged 97. He was 18 years old at the time of the massacre.

The village was never rebuilt. A new village was built from scratch nearby after the war. President Charles de Gaulle ordered that the ruins of the old village be maintained as a permanent memorial and museum.

Background

In February 1944, the 2nd SS Panzer Division Das Reich was stationed in the Southern French town of Valence-d'Agen, north of Toulouse, waiting to be resupplied with new equipment and fresh troops. Following the Normandy landings in June 1944, the division was ordered north to help stop the Allied advance. One of its units was the 4th SS Panzer Grenadier Regiment "Der Führer". Its staff included regimental commander SS-Standartenführer Sylvester Stadler, SS-Sturmbannführer Adolf Diekmann commanding the 1st Battalion and SS-Sturmbannführer Otto Weidinger, Stadler's designated successor who was with the regiment for familiarisation. Command passed to Weidinger on 14 June.

Early on the morning of 10 June 1944, Diekmann informed Weidinger that he had been approached by two members of the Milice, a paramilitary force of the Vichy Regime. They claimed that a Waffen-SS officer was being held prisoner by the French Resistance in Oradour-sur-Vayres, a nearby village. The captured officer was claimed to be SS-Sturmbannführer Helmut Kämpfe, commander of the 2nd SS Panzer Reconnaissance Battalion (also part of the Das Reich division). He may have been captured by the Maquis du Limousin the day before.

Massacre

On 10 June, Diekmann's battalion sealed off Oradour-sur-Glane and ordered everyone within to assemble in the village square to have their identity papers examined. This included six non-residents who happened to be bicycling through the village when the SS unit arrived. The women and children were locked in the church, and the village was looted. The men were led to six barns and sheds, where machine guns were already in place.

According to a survivor's account, the SS men then began shooting, aiming for their legs. When victims were unable to move, the SS men covered them with fuel and set the barns on fire. Only six men managed to escape. One of them was later seen walking down a road and was shot dead. In all, 190 Frenchmen died.

Burning of women and children in the church
The SS men next proceeded to the church and placed an incendiary device beside it. When it was ignited, women and children tried to escape through the doors and windows, only to be met with machine-gun fire. 247 women and 205 children died in the attack. The only survivor was 47-year-old Marguerite Rouffanche. She escaped through a rear sacristy window, followed by a young woman and child. All three were shot, two of them fatally. Rouffanche crawled to some pea bushes and remained hidden overnight until she was found and rescued the next morning. About twenty villagers had fled Oradour-sur-Glane as soon as the SS unit had appeared. That night, the village was partially razed.

Several days later, the survivors were allowed to bury the 643 dead inhabitants of Oradour-sur-Glane who had been killed in just a few hours. Adolf Diekmann said the atrocity was in retaliation for the partisan activity in nearby Tulle and the kidnapping and murder of SS commander Helmut Kämpfe, who was burned alive in a field ambulance with other German soldiers.

Amongst the men of the town killed were three priests who worked in the parish. It was also reported that the SS troops desecrated the church, including deliberately scattering Communion hosts before they forced the women and children into it. The Bishop of Limoges visited the village in the days after the massacre, one of the first public figures to do so, and his account of what he witnessed is one of the earliest available. Amongst those who went to bury the dead and document the event by taking photographs were some local seminarians.

Murphy report

Raymond J. Murphy, a 20-year-old American B-17 navigator shot down over Avord, France in late April 1944, witnessed the aftermath of the massacre. After being hidden by the French Resistance, Murphy was flown to England on 6 August, and in debriefing filled in a questionnaire on 7 August and made several drafts of a formal report. The version finally submitted on 15 August has a handwritten addendum:

Murphy's report was made public in 2011 after a Freedom of Information Act request by his grandson, an attorney in the United States Department of Justice National Security Division. It is the only account to mention crucifying a baby. Shane Harris concludes that the addendum is a true statement by Murphy and that the town, not named in Murphy's report, is very likely Oradour-sur-Glane.

German response
Protests at Diekmann's unilateral action followed, both from Field Marshal Erwin Rommel, General Walter Gleiniger, German commander in Limoges, as well as the Vichy Government. Even Stadler felt Diekmann had far exceeded his orders and began an investigation. However, Diekmann was killed in action shortly afterwards during the Battle of Normandy; many of the 3rd Company, which had conducted the massacre, were also killed in action. The investigation was then suspended.

Postwar trials
On 12 January 1953, a military tribunal in Bordeaux heard the charges against the surviving 65 of the 200 or so SS men who had been involved. Only 21 of them were present, as many were in West and East Germany, which would not extradite them. Seven of those present for the charges were German citizens, but 14 were Alsatians, French nationals whose home region had been occupied by Germany in 1940 and later integrated into the German Reich. All but one of the Alsatians claimed to have been forced to join the Waffen-SS. Such forced conscripts from Alsace and Lorraine called themselves the malgré-nous, meaning "against our will".

On 11 February, 20 defendants were found guilty. Continuing uproar in Alsace (including demands for autonomy) pressed the French parliament to pass an amnesty law for all the malgré-nous on 19 February. The convicted Alsatian former SS men were released shortly afterwards, which caused bitter protests in the Limousin region.

By 1958, all of the German defendants had also been released. General Heinz Lammerding of the Das Reich division, who had given the orders for retaliation against the Resistance, died in 1971, following a successful entrepreneurial career. At the time of the trial, he lived in Düsseldorf, in the former British occupation zone of West Germany, and the French government never obtained his extradition from West Germany.

The last trial of a Waffen-SS member who had been involved took place in 1983. Former SS-Obersturmführer Heinz Barth was tracked down in East Germany. Barth had participated in the massacre as a platoon leader in the "Der Führer" regiment, commanding 45 SS men. He was one of several charged with giving orders to shoot 20 men in a garage. Barth was sentenced to life imprisonment by the First Senate of the City Court of Berlin. He was released from prison in the reunified Germany in 1997 and died in August 2007.

On 8 January 2014, Werner Christukat, an 88-year-old former member of the 3rd Company of the 1st Battalion of the "Der Führer" regiment was charged, by the state court in Cologne, with 25 charges of murder and hundreds of counts of accessory to murder in connection with the massacre in Oradour-sur-Glane. The suspect, who was identified only as Werner C., had until 31 March 2014 to respond to the charges. If the case went to trial, it could have possibly been held in a juvenile court because the suspect was only 19 at the time it occurred. According to his attorney, Rainer Pohlen, the suspect acknowledged being at the village but denied being involved in any killings. On 9 December 2014, the court dropped the case, citing a lack of any witness statements or reliable documentary evidence able to disprove the suspect's contention that he was not a part of the massacre.

Memorial

After the war, General Charles de Gaulle decided the village should never be rebuilt, but would remain a memorial to the cruelty of the Nazi occupation. The new village of Oradour-sur-Glane (population 2,375 in 2012), northwest of the site of the massacre, was built after the war. The ruins of the original village remain as a memorial to the dead and to represent similar sites and events.

In 1999 French president Jacques Chirac dedicated a memorial museum, the Centre de la mémoire d'Oradour, near the entrance to the Village Martyr ("martyred village"). Its museum includes items recovered from the burned-out buildings: watches stopped at the time their owners were burned alive, glasses melted from the intense heat, and various personal items.On 6 June 2004, at the commemorative ceremony of the Normandy invasion in Caen, German chancellor Gerhard Schröder pledged that Germany would not forget the Nazi atrocities and specifically mentioned Oradour-sur-Glane.

On 4 September 2013, German president Joachim Gauck and French president François Hollande visited the ghost village of Oradour-sur-Glane. A joint news conference broadcast by the two leaders followed their tour of the site. This was the first time a German president had come to the site of one of the biggest World War II massacres on French soil.

On 28 April 2017, French presidential candidate Emmanuel Macron visited Oradour-sur-Glane and met with the only remaining survivor of the massacre, Robert Hébras. Hébras was 18 at the time of the massacre and died at age 97 in 2023.

In popular culture

Television
 The story of Oradour-sur-Glane was featured in the 1973–74 British documentary television series The World at War, narrated by Laurence Olivier. The first and final episodes (1 and 26, entitled "A New Germany" and "Remember" respectively) show helicopter views of the destroyed village, interspersed with pictures of the victims that appear on their graves.
 The massacre is referenced in the 2010 series World War II in Colour in the episode "Overlord", which aired on 7 January 2010. It was also featured in part 2 of Hitler's Death Army, which aired on 27 November 2015, and showed both images from the time along with the ruins as they are today.

Film
 The 1975 French film Le vieux fusil, is based on these facts.
 A feature film, Une Vie avec Oradour, was released in September 2011 in France.

Literature
 In the 1947 Russian novel The Storm by Stalin Prize-winner Ilya Ehrenburg, there is a fictionalized detailed description of the massacre (part vi, chapter a), citing the actual place and the actual SS unit responsible.  The novel was published in English in 1948 by the Foreign Languages Publishing House in Moscow, and in 1949 by Gaer Associates of New York.
 In The Hanging Garden (1998) by Ian Rankin, Detective Inspector John Rebus investigates a suspected war criminal accused of leading the massacre of the fictional village of Villefranche d'Albarede, based on Oradour-sur-Glane.
 The poet Gillian Clarke, National Poet of Wales, commemorates the massacre at Oradour-sur-Glane in two poems from her 2009 collection A Recipe for Water, "Oradour-sur-Glane" and "Singer".
 In 2013, Helen Watts published One Day in Oradour, a short novel based on the events of 1944. Some names of the characters and locations have been changed, and some characters are composites of several individuals.
 In 2015, Ethan Mordden published One Day in France, a short novel based on the events of 1944. Covering a twenty-four-hour period and moving back and forth between Oradour and nearby Limoges, the story fits invented characters into the historical record.
 The plot of The Alice Network, a 2017 historical novel by American author Kate Quinn, incorporates a reference to the massacre. Real-life survivor Marguerite Rouffanche appears as a minor character.

Music
 Silent Planet's 2014 song "Tiny Hands (Au Revoir)" describes the massacre in Oradour-sur-Glane through the eyes of Madame Marguerite Rouffanche, the sole survivor of the church massacre.

See also

 Babi Yar
 Belchite, a town in Spain with a similar memorial
 Distomo massacre, on the same date
 List of French villages destroyed in World War I
 Ivanci massacre
 Kalavryta massacre
 Kandanos
 Koriukivka massacre
 Katyn massacre
 Khatyn massacre
 Ležáky massacre
 Lidice massacre
 Lipa massacre
 Massacre of villages under Kamešnica
 Maquis (World War II)
 Maquis du Vercors
 Maillé massacre
 Michniów massacre
 Putten raid
 Riga synagogues
 Sant'Anna di Stazzema massacre
 Sochy massacre
 Tulle massacre
 Wola massacre

References
Notes

Bibliography

 

 

 

Farmer, Sarah. Martyred Village: Commemorating the 1944 Massacre at Oradour-sur-Glane. University of California Press, 2000.

 

Fouché, Jean-Jacques. Massacre At Oradour: France, 1944; Coming To Grips With Terror, Northern Illinois University Press, 2004.

 

 

 

 

 

 

Further reading
 Hastings, Max (1982) Das Reich: March of the Second SS Panzer Division Through France Henry Holt & Co. 
 Hastings, Max (1991) Das Reich: Resistance and the March of the Second SS Panzer Division Through France, June 1944 Michael Joseph Ltd. 
 Hawes, Douglas W. (2014) Oradour. Le verdict final (Oradour. The Final Verdict) SEUIL 
 Hébras, Robert (2003) Oradour-sur-Glane: The Tragedy hour by Hour Chemins 
 Pauchou, Guy and Pierre Masfrand (l970) Oradour-sur-Glane: vision d'épouvante (Orador-sur-Glane: a vision of horror) Charles Lavauzelle

External links

 Study of 1944 reprisals at Oradour-sur-Glane (with picture gallery containing lists of casualties)
  Oradour-sur-Glane Memorial Center
 Full list of casualties

1944 crimes
1944 in France
Collective punishment
Former populated places in France
Ghost towns in France
June 1944 events
Massacres committed by Nazi Germany
Massacres in 1944
Massacres in France
Murdered French children
Nazi war crimes in France
Oradour-sur-Glane massacre
Vichy France
War crimes of the Waffen-SS